In organic chemistry a hydroxy ketone (often referred to simply as a ketol) is a functional group consisting of a ketone flanked by a hydroxyl group. In the two main classes, the hydroxyl group can be placed in the alpha position (an alpha-hydroxy ketone RCR′(OH)(CO)R) or in the beta position (a beta-hydroxy ketone, RCR′(OH)CR2(CO)R). 
 An α-hydroxy ketone can consist of either a primary alcohol (e.g. hydroxyacetone) or a secondary alcohol; the latter are often broadly referred to as acyloins
 Prominent β-hydroxy ketones are aldol adducts.
 Only terminal α-hydroxy ketones can give positive Fehling's test.

References